Chad Anthony Barrett (born 22 May 1989 at Johannesburg) is a South African cricketer active since 2014 who has played for Northamptonshire. He is a righthanded batsman who bowls right arm fast medium pace.

He made his first-class debut for Northamptonshire against Sri Lanka in June 2014, but did not play another first-class game for two years. In the meantime he played second team cricket for six different counties, before he was selected to play for Northants against Worcestershire. In this match he batted at number ten, and scored 114*, breaking the record score for a Northants number ten.He recently completed the ECB Level 4 Coaching Program, becoming the youngest person to complete the course.

Notes

External links

1989 births
South African cricketers
Northamptonshire cricketers
Living people